9–11 Cathedral Street is an historic building in Dunkeld, Perth and Kinross, Scotland. It is two storeys, with a three-window frontage in an L-plan.

Number 9 was formerly the home of Alexander Mackenzie (1822–1892), the first Liberal Prime Minister of Canada, who was born in Logierait.

See also 
 List of listed buildings in Dunkeld And Dowally, Perth and Kinross

References 

Cathedral Street 9–11
Category B listed buildings in Perth and Kinross
1715 establishments in Scotland